Rossmoyne is a census-designated place (CDP) in Sycamore Township, Hamilton County, Ohio, United States,  northeast of downtown Cincinnati. The population of Rossmoyne was 1,788 at the 2020 census.

History
Rossmoyne was originally known as Mill Dale in the 19th century.

Geography
It is bordered by Deer Park to the south, Dillonvale to the west, Blue Ash to the north, and Kenwood to the east.

Demographics

References

Census-designated places in Hamilton County, Ohio
Census-designated places in Ohio